There are many types of car body styles. They vary depending on intended use, market position, location, and the era they were made in.

Current styles 
Buggy Lightweight off-road vehicle with sparse bodywork. Originally two- or four-wheeled carriages in the 19th and early 20th centuries pulled by one horse, the motorized buggies were developed in the 1960s and grew in popularity and diversity.

Convertible / cabriolet  
 Has a retractable or removable roof. A convertible allows an open-air driving experience, with the ability to provide a roof when required. Most convertible roofs are either a folding textile soft-top or a retractable metal roof. Convertibles with a metal roof are sometimes called 'retractable hardtop', 'coupé convertible', or 'coupé cabriolet'.

Coupé
 Has a sloping rear roofline and generally two doors (although several four-door cars have also been marketed as coupés). Coupés are generally considered more sporty than their sedan counterparts.

Flower car
 In the US used in the funeral industry to carry flowers for burial services. Typically a coupé-style, forward-passenger compartment with an open well in the rear.

Hatchback / Liftback
 Car with a hatch-type rear door that is hinged at the roof and opens upwards. The term "hatchback" can also refer to that type of rear door, which is also used on several sports cars, SUVs, and large luxury cars.

Hearse / funeral coach 
 The modification of a passenger car to provide a long cargo area for carrying a coffin or casket. Hearses often have large glass panels for viewing the coffin.

Limousine
 A luxury-type vehicle that is typically driven by a chauffeur with a partition between the driver's compartment and the passenger's compartment. Limousines may also be stretched to provide more room in the rear passenger compartment. In some European usage, the word describes a regular four-door sedan body style.

Microvan  
The smallest size of minivan/MPV.

Minivan / multi-purpose vehicle (MPV) / people carrier / people mover 
 Vehicle designed to transport passengers in the rear seating row(s) with reconfigurable seats in two or three rows. Typically has a combined passenger and cargo area, a high roof, a flat floor, a sliding door for rear passengers, and high H-point seating. In Europe, some small minivans have been marketed as 'leisure activity vehicles'.

Panel van / car-derived van / sedan delivery 
 A cargo vehicle based upon passenger car chassis and typically has one row of seats with no side windows at the rear. Panel vans are smaller than panel trucks and cargo vans, both of which are built on a truck chassis.

Panel truck 
 A pickup truck that has a fully enclosed truck topper in its back, giving it a van-like appearance.

Pickup truck / pickup 
 A light-duty, open-bed truck. In South Africa, a pickup truck is called a "bakkie".

Roadster
 An open two-seat car with emphasis on sporting appearance or character. Initially, an American term for a two-seat car with no weather protection, usage has spread internationally and has evolved to include two-seat convertibles.

Sedan / saloon
 A fixed-roof car in a three-box design. These form separate compartments for engine, passenger, and cargo. Sedans can have two- or four-doors. A sedan is called a "berlina" in Spanish and Italian, or a "berline" in French.

Shooting-brake
 Initially, a vehicle used to carry shooting parties with their equipment and game; later used to describe custom-built wagons by high-end coachbuilders, subsequently synonymous with station wagon / estate car; and in contemporary usage a three or five-door wagons combining features of a station wagon and a coupé.

Station wagon / estate car
 Has a two-box design, a large cargo area, and a rear tailgate that is hinged to open for access to the cargo area. The body style is similar to a hatchback car; however, station wagons are longer and are more likely to have the roofline extended to the rear of the car (resulting in a vertical rear surface to the car) to maximize the cargo space. In French, a station wagon is called a "break".

Targa top
 A semi-convertible style used on some sports cars, featuring a fully removable soft or hard roof panel that leaves the A and B pillars in place on the car body.

Ute / coupe utility 
 Based on a passenger sedan chassis and has a cargo tray in the rear integrated with the passenger body (as opposed to a pickup truck, which has a separate cargo tray). In Australia, the term "ute" was originally used solely for coupé utility cars; however, in recent years, it has also been used for pickup trucks.

Historic styles 
Baquet 
 Has two rows of raised seats, similar to horse-drawn carriages; usually did not have front doors, a roof, or a windshield. The baquet ("bath tub") style was produced in the early 1900s in Europe. 
Also a marketing term used on cars built in the United States in the 1920s and 1930s.

Barchetta 
 Italian two-seat sports car with either an open-top or convertible roof. The term was originally used for lightweight open-top racing cars from the late 1940s through the 1950s. Since the 1950s, the name barchetta ("little boat" in Italian) has been revived on several occasions, mostly for cars with convertible roofs that are not specifically intended for racing.

Berlinetta
 Italian sports coupé, typically with two seats but also including 2+2 cars. The original meaning for berlinetta in Italian is "little saloon."

Cabrio coach
 A retractable textile roof, similar to a convertible/cabriolet. The difference is that where a convertible often has the B-pillar, C-pillar and other bodywork removed, the cabrio-coach retains all bodywork to the top of the door frames and just replaces the roof skin with a retractable fabric panel.

Coupé de ville / Sedanca de ville / town car 
 An external or open-topped driver's position and an enclosed compartment for passengers. Produced from 1908 until 1939. Although the different terms may have once had specific meanings for certain car manufacturers or countries, the terms are often used interchangeably.
 Some coupé de villes have the passengers separated from the driver in a fully enclosed compartment, while others have a canopy for the passengers and no partition between the driver and the passengers (therefore passengers enter the compartment via the driver's area).

Hardtop
 Usually describes pillarless hardtops that are cars without a B-pillar often styled to give the appearance of a convertible. Popular in the United States from the mid 1950s through the mid 1970s.
 It also refers to a separate top that is removable and made of metal or other hard material for sports cars or small SUVs.

Landaulet
 A car where the rear passengers are covered by a convertible top. Often the driver is separated from the rear passengers with a partition, as per a limousine.

Personal luxury car
 American luxury coupés and convertibles produced from 1952 to 2007. The cars prioritized comfort, styling, and a high level of interior features.

Phaeton
 An open-roof automobile without any fixed weather protection, which was popular from the 1900s until the 1930s.

Roadster utility
 An open-topped roadster body and a rear cargo bed.

Runabout
 A light, inexpensive, open car with basic bodywork and no windshield, top, or doors. Most runabouts had just a single row of seats, providing seating for two passengers. 

Torpedo
 Body style was a type of automobile body used from 1908 until the mid-1930s, which had a streamlined profile and a folding or detachable soft top. The design consists of a hood or bonnet line raised to be level with the car's waistline, resulting in a straight beltline from front to back. 

Touring
 A style of open car built in the United States that seats four or more people. The style was popular from the early 1900s to the 1930s.

See also 

Automotive design
Car classification
Car model
Vehicle size class
Car body configurations

References

Bibliography